Sumner-Bonney Lake School District is a school district in Washington, that serves the cities of Bonney Lake, Edgewood, Sumner, and unincorporated areas of east Pierce County, Washington.  The district has 14 schools, a family support center, a district athletic complex, two performing arts centers, public gymnasiums, and a recreation department.

Boundary
The district includes the majority of Sumner and most of Alderton, Bonney Lake and North Puyallup. The district also includes portions of Edgewood, Lake Tapps, McMillin, Pacific (Pierce County portion), Prairie Ridge, and Tehaleh.

Elementary schools
 Bonney Lake Elementary, Bonney Lake, EST 1961 (Renovated 2010)
 Crestwood Elementary, Bonney Lake
 Daffodil Valley Elementary, Sumner
 Donald Eismann Elementary, Bonney Lake, EST 2010
 Emerald Hills Elementary, Bonney Lake, EST 1979 (Rebuilt 2019)
 Liberty Ridge Elementary, Bonney Lake Est 1998
 Maple Lawn Elementary, Sumner
 McAlder Elementary, Puyallup, Permanently closed in 2012, and now being used by Cascade Christian Schools
 Tehaleh Heights Elementary, Bonney Lake, EST 2018
 Victor Falls Elementary, Bonney Lake

Middle schools
 Lakeridge Middle School, Bonney Lake, EST 1980 as Lakeridge Junior High (Rebuilt in 2010 and as Lakeridge Middle School)
 Mountain View Middle School, Bonney Lake, EST 1998 (Currently in renovation as of Mid 2021)
 Sumner Middle School, Sumner, EST as Sumner Junior High (Changed to Sumner Middle School in 2006 and renovated in 2012)

High schools
 Bonney Lake High School, Bonney Lake EST 2005
 Sumner High School, Sumner EST circa early-1900s in 3-story brick traditional structure; followed by newer 1-story building constructed 1954 (Building expansion in progress as of May 2022)

References

https://www.sumnersd.org/site/Default.aspx?PageID=3945#:~:text=1%2F13%2F22-,Sumner%20High%20School's%20Modernization%20and%20Expansion%20Phase%201%20construction%20project,technology%2C%20security%2C%20restrooms).

External links
 

School districts in Washington (state)
Education in Pierce County, Washington